Sphenomorphus indicus (Indian forest skink) is a species of skink.

Description
Its habit is lacertiform; the distance between the end of the snout and the fore limb contained about 1.6 times in the distance between axilla and groin. Snout short, obtuse; loreal region nearly vertical. Lower eyelid scaly. Nostril pierced in a single nasal, or between a nasal and a postnasal; no supranasal; rostral convex, largely m contact with the frontonasal, which is broader than long, and forms a narrow suture with the frontal; the latter as long as frontoparietal and parietals together, in contact with the first, second, and third supraoculars; 4 large supraoculars, followed by 2 very small ones; first supraocular not much longer than second; 9 or 10 supracilianes, first largest; frontoparietals and interparietal distinct, former a little longer than latter; parietals forming a short suture behind the interparietal; no nuchals; fifth and sixth upper labials largest and below the eye. Ear-opening oval, smaller than eye-opening; no auricular lobules. 36 or 38 smooth scales round the middle of the body, laterals smallest. A pair of large pre-anals. When the limbs are pressed against the body, the hind limb reaches the elbow or not quite so far. Digits rather elongate, compressed; subdigital lamellae smooth or obtusely keeled, 17 to 20 under the fourth toe. Tail almost twice as long as head and body. Brown or olive above, uniform or with scattered darker dots; sides of head and body dark brown, light-margined above; usually with large light spots; lower surface whitish.
From snout to vent 3.5 inches; tail

Distribution
S China (incl. Hainan, west to E Xizang = Tibet, and north to Henan, Shaanxi, and Gansu, Guangdong: Nan Ao Island), Bangladesh, Bhutan, 
Taiwan, Thailand (likely in Bilauk Tuang mountain fide Taylor 1963: 1020), Vietnam,
India (Darjeeling, Sikkim) east to Indochina and south to W Malaysia

Type locality: Sikkim, Himalayas.

Notes

References
 Annandale, Nelson 1905 Contributions to Oriental Herpetology. Suppl. III. Notes on the Oriental lizards in the Indian Museum, with a list of the species recorded from British India and Ceylon. J. Asiat. Soc. Bengal  (2) 1: 139-151
 Das, I. & Palden, J. 2000 A herpetological collection from Bhutan, with new country records. Herpetological Review 31 (4): 256-258
 Gray, J. E. 1853 Descriptions of some undescribed species of reptiles collected by Dr. Joseph Hooker in the Khassia Mountains, East Bengal, and Sikkim Himalaya. Ann. Mag. Nat. Hist. (2) 12: 386 - 392
 Yang, Yuhua;Gao, Zhengfa;Zhao, Ermi 1989 Karyotypic studies of Sphenomorphus indicus (Scincidae) and Takydromus septentrionalis (Lacertidae) Chinese Herpetological Research 2 (1): 55-59

External links
 
 http://itgmv1.fzk.de/www/itg/uetz/herp/photos/Sphenomorphus_indicus.jpg 
 http://itgmv1.fzk.de/www/itg/uetz/herp/photos/Sphenomorphus_indicus2.jpg 
 http://itgmv1.fzk.de/www/itg/uetz/herp/photos/Sphenomorphus_indicus3.jpg

indicus
Reptiles of Asia
Fauna of Southeast Asia
Reptiles of Thailand
Reptiles described in 1853
Taxa named by John Edward Gray